Double Dragon Neon is a 2012 beat 'em up video game in the Double Dragon series. It was developed by WayForward Technologies and published by Majesco Entertainment, and is a reboot of the Double Dragon series. It was the first game in the series where Million, the previous owner of the Double Dragon series after Technōs Japan became defunct, had no involvement in its development. Arc System Works bought the series rights in 2015 along with all intellectual properties of Technōs Japan.

Series creator Yoshihisa Kishimoto was consulted during the game's development, and described Neon as "a very western adaptation of Double Dragon" with certain mechanics taken from the previous games, and a "mood and feel" that reminded him of the original arcade game.

Gameplay
As with previous installments of the series, the player takes control of martial artists Billy Lee (Player 1) and Jimmy Lee (Player 2) in their fight to rescue Marian from the Shadow Warriors gang, this time led by the super-lich Skullmageddon. The journey starts on the city streets and progresses through an outer-space dojo, Asian countryside, a genetics lab, and a graveyard before concluding at Skullmageddon's palace.

In addition to the standard punch, kick, and jump buttons and a designated run button, the player now has an evade button for dodging attacks. If the player times their evasion right so as to perfectly dodge an enemy attack, they will "Gleam" by briefly glowing red, during which time their attacks will be more powerful. The player can collect life-replenishing sodas, money to buy items from shops, and special mixtapes that can be equipped from a pause menu. Two different tapes can be equipped at once: one to grant the brothers a powerful attack that consumes a separate energy meter, and one to alter their statistics and grant special effects (such as making it easier to stun enemies or healing HP with every connecting blow). By collecting multiple copies of a tape, its effect gradually increases until it reaches a maximum capacity. Each tape's maximum capacity can be increased further by visiting a "Tapesmith" and paying him Mythril, which is obtained from defeated bosses.

In a two-player game, both Billy and Jimmy can utilize a special "high-five" technique to split and share their life meters to an equal amount, "psych" the other one out to harm them or make them fall over, or to instantly trigger a Gleam effect. If one player is defeated in battle, the other player has a limited time to revive him before a life is deducted (unless both players are defeated together). When one player is completely out of lives, he can steal one from the other player if he has at least two left.

Development
Yoshihisa Kishimoto, designer of the original two Double Dragon arcade games, served as a consultant during the development of Neon, offering feedback on character designs and gameplay elements.

Double Dragon Neon was released in North America on September 11, 2012, in Europe on September 20, and in Japan on December 12, 2013 on PlayStation 3 via the PlayStation Network, and worldwide on September 12 on Xbox 360 via Xbox Live Arcade, to coincide with the 25th anniversary of the series. The game's dialogue and graphical style is heavily 80s-inspired, and features a soundtrack composed by Jake Kaufman, inspired by the original Double Dragon as well as 80's pop music and arcade game soundtracks.

This is also the first commercially released Double Dragon game to use 3D graphics rendered with polygon-based models. The game has been released for Microsoft Windows on February 6, 2014. Ported by Abstraction Games, the port features online multiplayer. Skullmaggedon along with the Double Dragon Neon incarnations of Billy, Jimmy and Marion would later cameo as shopkeepers for WayForward's River City Girls (a spin-off game based on the Kunio-kun property by Technos Japan).

A port for Nintendo Switch was released on December 21, 2020.

Reception

Double Dragon Neon received mixed reviews. Electronic Gaming Monthly rated the game a 90/100, praising the '80s feel, humor and the gameplay.

GameSpot rated it a 7/10 and praised the game for its humor and rewarding combat system.

References

External links
Official website 

2012 video games
3D beat 'em ups
Arc System Works games
Cooperative video games
Double Dragon
Majesco Entertainment games
Nintendo Switch games
PlayStation 3 games
PlayStation Network games
Side-scrolling beat 'em ups
Video game reboots
Video games about skeletons
Video games about siblings
Video games developed in the United States
Video games scored by Jake Kaufman
Video games set in 1987
WayForward games
Windows games
Xbox 360 Live Arcade games
Xbox Cloud Gaming games
Multiplayer and single-player video games